Rahim Mirakhori (30 April 1956) is an Iranian football defender who played for Iran in the 1984 Asian Cup.

International Records

Honours 

Asian Cup:
Fourth Place : 1984

References

External links
Team Melli Stats

Living people
Iranian footballers
Place of birth missing (living people)
1956 births
Association football defenders
Iran international footballers